Dubyago may refer to:

Astronomy
 Dubyago (crater), lunar crater

People
 Dmitry Dubyago, Russian astronomer
 Alexander Dubyago, Soviet astronomer